Oliva esiodina is a species of sea snail, a marine gastropod mollusk in the family Olividae, the olives.

Distribution
This marine species occurs in Oceania.

References

In Illustrations Conchyliologiques ou description et figures de toutes les coquilles connues vivantes et fossiles, classées suivant le système de Lamarck modifié d'après les progrès de la science et comprenant les genres nouveaux et les espèces récemment découvertes, p. Oliva, p. 13-20; Pecten, pls 15, 51, 50, 53, 52; Strombus, pls 26, 10, 13, 16, 22, 23, 25
 Greifeneder, D. & Tursch, B., 1996. - Type specimens vs. figures: on the identity of some Oliva species. Apex 11(3-4): 163-175
 Vervaet F.L.J. (2018). The living Olividae species as described by Pierre-Louis Duclos. Vita Malacologica. 17: 1-111

External links
  Reeve, L. A. (1850). Monograph of the genus Oliva. In: Conchologia Iconica, or, illustrations of the shells of molluscous animals, vol. 6, pl. 1-30 and unpaginated text. L. Reeve & Co., London
 Duclos, P. L. (1835-1840). Histoire naturelle générale et particulière de tous les genres de coquilles univalves marines a l'état vivant et fossile publiée par monographie. Genre Olive. Paris: Institut de France. 33 plates: pls 1-12
 Tursch B. & Greifeneder D. (1989). Studies on Olividae. X. The taxonomic status of Oliva esiodina Duclos, 1844, O. duclosi Reeve, 1850 and O. lentiginosa Reeve, 1850. Apex. 4(4): 57-68
 MNHN, Paris: syntypes

esiodina
Gastropods described in 1844